FACE à FACE is a gay and lesbian film festival that is held annually in St Etienne, France, for four days in November. The mission of the festival is to promote positive attitudes towards homosexuality through art and culture. In the common cause of standing up against discrimination. The festival creates an open platform on LGBT (Lesbian, Gay, Bi and Transgender) and organizes events that highlights the best of Gay and Lesbian Cinema. Its first event was held from September 30 to October 2, 2005.

History
FACE à FACE was founded in 2005 by the community center space Boris Vian, the association against AIDS Actis Loire 42 and the association of gay and lesbian hiking Rando's rhone-alpes. The festival's first event was held from September 30 to October 2, 2005, featured selected films various meeting sessions and debates aimed at high school students. and was attended by directors, distributors, writers, artists, journalists, as well as members of international LGBT communities.

Editions and Themes

•    1st edition (September 30 to October 2, 2005): Homosexuality and the province Homoparenthood

•    2nd edition (October 27 to 29, 2006): Queer yesterday, today and Gay Homosexuality and Religion: Utopia?

•    3rd edition (15 to 18 November 2007): homos at work, homosexuality in the workplace

•    4th edition (20 to 23 November 2008): 2008 is it still revolutionary to be gay?

•    5th edition (26 to 29 November 2009): National Conference of 1RES gay and lesbian cinema

•    6th edition (25 to 28 November 2010): Sport and homosexuality

•    7th edition (24 to 27 November 2011): Homos here and elsewhere

Attendance
The festival attracts wide and mixed audience from various countries. Nearly 2,000 spectators travel to St Etienne each year to attend the festival.

Awards
The festival gives out four awards, the "Feature film Award"/"Long métrage", the "Short Film Award"/"court métrage", the "documentary Award"/"documentaire" and an "Audience Award"/Prix "spécial du public".

References

External links
FACE à FACE, Lesbian and Gay Film Festival website
Queer Film Festivals in November 
Gay Traveller's Network
FACE à FACE Facebook page

LGBT film festivals in France
Saint-Étienne
Film festivals established in 2005
2005 establishments in France